Slaughter in the Vatican is the debut studio album by American heavy metal band Exhorder, released on October 23, 1990 through Roadrunner Records. It was reissued by Roadrunner in 2003 in a double-disc package with the band's follow-up album The Law and reissued again in 2008.

The album saw the band compared with Pantera, with AllMusic commenting on the album's "death metal-style double kick drums, chugging guitar riffs played at both slow and blistering tempos, and, to top it all off, the gruff but very expressive lead vocals of frontman Kyle Thomas". On May 25, 2018, Slaughter in the Vatican was inducted into the Decibel Magazine Hall of Fame.

Track listing

Personnel
Kyle Thomas – vocals
Vinnie LaBella – lead guitar, bass
Jay Ceravolo – rhythm guitar, bass
Chris Nail – drums

Production
Arranged by Exhorder
Produced by Exhorder and Scott Burns
Recorded and mixed by Scott Burns at Morrisound Recording (Tampa, Florida)
Mastered by Mike Fuller at Fullersound (Miami, Florida)
All songs published by Roadrunner Music Publishing
Photography by Kurt Coste; artwork and illustrations by Kent Mathieu

References

1990 debut albums
Exhorder albums
Roadrunner Records albums
Albums produced by Scott Burns (record producer)
Albums recorded at Morrisound Recording